The Man Who Haunted Himself is a 1970 British psychological thriller film written and directed by Basil Dearden (his final film prior to his death by automobile accident in 1971) and starring Roger Moore. It is based on the 1957 novel The Strange Case of Mr Pelham by Anthony Armstrong, and is a variation on the Jekyll and Hyde story.

The story was previously filmed as a 30 minute short for television as part of the series Alfred Hitchcock Presents: Series 1 Episode 11: The Case of Mr Pelham.

In 2011 Moore said his role in the film was his favourite. "It was a film I actually got to act in, rather than just being all white teeth and flippant and heroic."

Plot

While driving home from his London office in his Rover P5B, Harold Pelham, a director of Freeman, Pelham & Dawson, a marine technology company and very conservative creature of habit, seems to undergo a sudden personality change and starts to drive both fast and recklessly on his way home, imagining himself in a sports car, and ending in a serious high-speed crash. On the operating table he briefly suffers clinical death, after which there briefly appear to be two heartbeats on the monitor.

After he recovers from the accident Pelham notices odd things occurring and people acting strangely, and he gradually finds his life in turmoil. Friends, colleagues and acquaintances claim to have seen him in places where he has no memory of being or doing things he can't recall, involving behaving in rash ways quite unlike his usual character. When he gets home from work, a friend is at his house for a drink which he doesn't recall arranging, and an attractive girl at the company swimming pool casts him a knowing glance. At bedtime he and his wife have a somewhat tense but amicable discussion about their recent lack of a love life. His wife also notices a mysterious silver car (a Lamborghini Islero) which she sees parked outside their house, but gives it no further thought. The driver of the car is then seen lighting a cigarette and snapping the match stick in half after he blows it out, exactly as Pelham does.

There seems to be a spy at work trying to force a merger with a rival company. Pelham drives to the research and development centre in Rugby to try and see where the leak began.

Soon he suspects there is a "double" masquerading as him. On a night out at the company club with his wife, he hopes to energise their relationship by indulging her request to go gambling, but he is tense and clearly not interested. As they are about to leave he bumps into the attractive girl, who sees his wife a short distance away and says "I didn't know you were married." His wife notices the exchange and is furious, suspecting the worst. She threatens to leave him. He finds out where the girl lives and confronts her; confused, she makes it clear that "he" was having an affair with her. He angrily denies the affair; the woman, hurt and almost hysterical, yells at him to leave.

At his usual the barber‘s he is told, "I cut your hair yesterday".

At work Pelham finds out that apparently he was supporting a merger that he now opposes with the board. He confronts an executive of the other company, who explains how the two of them had clandestinely arranged the deal in a series of meetings, to "his" (the double's) benefit as well as the company's, when "he" revealed a "top secret" technology breakthrough his company was about to make. When he confronts the rival firm (run by Ashton) he is reminded of three secret meetings: at the top of The Monument; in the London Planetarium; and in a boat on The Serpentine.

He phones home and due to a misunderstanding, his butler Luigi thinks he is asking for Mr Pelham. Luigi says "I will just get him". He drives home quickly.

Distraught and unable to explain the unfolding events, he consults a psychiatrist, Dr Harris, and undergoes extended treatment in his clinic, where Harris explains that he doesn't believe Pelham is mad but perhaps was acting out of a subconscious desire to break out of his obsessively rigid lifestyle. He agrees to be admitted to the psychiatrist’s clinic for a few days’ observation. On his discharge the doctor persuades him to adopt some less conventional behaviour, so he goes to work dressed quite differently. However, during his time away, the double finalised the merger and took his wife out on the town, culminating in their going home and sleeping together. Pelham calls his home from the office and is astonished when the phone is answered by someone claiming to be himself. On edge, he drives to his house as quickly as possible, and inside comes face to face with his double, who calmly insists he is the real Pelham, pointing out the uncharacteristic clothes the visitor is wearing. The family and his best friend are all there and side with the double.

After asking the others to let the two of them speak alone, the double tells the "real" Pelham that the new clothes were a mistake, and explains how on the operating table the double was "let out" but there is only room in this world for one of them. Both insist they will go to the police.

The real Pelham drives off in his Rover in a greatly agitated state. The double immediately leaves and pursues him in the sports car. Dr Harris happens to see both men and is shocked. After a high-speed chase in the rain, the two cars race towards each other on a bridge. The real Pelham swerves off into the river, and just before he hits the water his image fades away. The double stops and looks down into the water, and then, to the audible sound of a double heartbeat, he briefly clutches his chest as if in extreme pain, but the spasm soon passes and he becomes calm: there is only one Pelham again.

Cast

Roger Moore as Harold Pelham 
Hildegarde Neil as Eve Pelham 
Alastair Mackenzie as Michael Pelham 
Hugh Mackenzie as James Pelham 
Kevork Malikyan as Luigi, Pelham's butler
Thorley Walters as Frank Bellamy 
Anton Rodgers as Tony Alexander 
Olga Georges-Picot as Julie Anderson 
Freddie Jones as Dr. Harris, the psychiatrist
John Welsh as Sir Charles Freeman
Edward Chapman as Barton
Laurence Hardy as Mason 
Charles Lloyd-Pack as Jameson 
Gerald Sim as Morrison
Ruth Trouncer as Miss Bird, Pelham's secretary 
Aubrey Richards as Research Scientist
Anthony Nicholls as Sir Arthur Richardson
John Carson as Ashton
Basil Henson as Casino Manager (Uncredited)
Tony Wright as Man In Club (Uncredited)

Production

The film was one of the first three greenlit by Bryan Forbes while he was head of EMI Films (the others were Hoffman and And Soon the Darkness). The film was announced in August 1969.

Lamborghini Islero
The 1969 Lamborghini Islero GTS that appeared in the film, registration YLR 11G, sold at auction in 2010 for £106,400. It is one of only five right-hand-drive versions of the model to be built. The car was auctioned again in March 2020, achieving a hammer price of £265,000 (£296,800 including commission, fees, etc.).

Release
According to Roger Moore's autobiography, My Word is my Bond, this film was part of a series of small budgeted films featuring star actors working for substantially less than their usual fees. Moore says that the film should have been successful, but amateurish marketing made this impossible. Box-office results were disappointing.

Though initial reviews were negative, the film is considered by many as one of Roger Moore's best non-Bond films. It has also had many recent positive reviews on internet sites, including one naming the film as an under-rated classic. Ironically, Moore's character of Pelham speaks the line "Come on Charles, espionage isn't all James Bond and Her Majesty's Secret Service" when discussing the leaking of corporate secrets.

Roger Moore said this was his favourite film from his own work.

DVD and Blu-ray releases
The film was released on DVD format in 2005 with a PG rating. The DVD includes special features including a commentary by Roger Moore and Bryan Forbes.

A new HD restoration from the original film elements was released in a dual-format package on 24 June 2013 by Network. The Blu-ray disc is in a widescreen aspect ratio as was used in cinemas. Special features include - 34 minute music suite of Michael J. Lewis's original score; a commentary track recorded in 2005, featuring Roger Moore and Bryan Forbes; the original theatrical trailer; four image galleries, including storyboards; and promotional material in PDF format for reading on a PC. An article is available on Network's website detailing the transfer and restoration of the film.

References

External links

1970 films
1970s fantasy films
1970 independent films
1970s mystery thriller films
1970s psychological thriller films
British mystery thriller films
British supernatural thriller films
British independent films
Films directed by Basil Dearden
Films shot at Associated British Studios
Films set in London
Films based on British novels
EMI Films films
Films with screenplays by Basil Dearden
Films with screenplays by Michael Relph
Films with screenplays by Bryan Forbes
1970s English-language films
1970s British films